The 1917 Stanley Cup Finals was contested by the Pacific Coast Hockey Association (PCHA) champion Seattle Metropolitans and the National Hockey Association (NHA)  and Stanley Cup defending champion Montreal Canadiens. Seattle defeated Montreal three games to one in a best-of-five game series to become the first United States-based team to win the Cup. The inspiring story of the Mets' 1917 championship was chronicled in the 2019 book, When It Mattered Most. The series was also the first Stanley Cup Final to be played in the United States, and the last Stanley Cup final to not feature a National Hockey League team, as the NHA rebranded as the NHL in November 1917.

Paths to the Finals
Seattle won the PCHA title after finishing the 1916–17 regular season in first place with a 16–8 record. Meanwhile, Montreal advanced to the final series after narrowly defeating the Ottawa Senators, 7–6, in a two-game total-goals playoff series to end the 1916–17 NHA season.

Game summaries

The games of the Final were played at the Seattle Ice Arena. Games one and three were played under PCHA seven-man rules; games two and four were played under NHA six-man rules. Bernie Morris scored 14 of Seattle's 23 total goals for the series, including six in their 9–1 victory in game four. Future Hockey Hall of Fame goaltender Hap Holmes recorded a 2.90 goals-against average for the Mets.

Montreal Canadiens NHA champion roster - George Vezina goalie, Bert Corbeau defence, Harry Mummery defence, Edouard "Newsy" Lalonde (Captain) Center-Rover Tommy Smith center, Didier Pitre right wing, Reginald "Reg" Noble left wing, Jack Laviolette left wing, Louis Berlinguette left wing, Wilfred "Billy" Coutu defence spares - Sarsfield "Steve" Malone center, George "Skinner" Poulin center, Jules Rochon - defence Harold "Hal" McNamara defence 
Dave Majors defence, Arthur Brooks defence, Joe Maltais right wing, U.P. Boulder (President), George "Kennedy" Kendall (Owner/Manager-Coach),

Seattle Metropolitans PCHA champion roster - Harry "Happy" Holmes goalie, Roy Rickey defence, Everard "Ed" Carpenter defence, Jack Walker rover-right wing, Bernie Morris center, Frank Foyston (Captain) left wings, Jim Riley left wing, Bobby "Stubby" Rowe defence, Carol "Cully" Wilson right wing, Pete Muldoon (Owner/Manager-Coach).

Game one
In game one, Didier Pitre scored four goals as he led the Canadiens to an 8–4 victory. Pitre opened the scoring in the third minute before Morris tied it four minutes later. Jack Laviolette scored twenty seconds later to put the Canadiens ahead, followed by Pitre to put the Canadiens ahead 3–1 after one period. Con Corbeau and Newsy Lalonde scored in the second to put the Canadiens ahead 5–1 after two periods. In the third, Morris and Frank Foyston scored to bring Seattle within two goals, before Pitre scored again. Morris scored to make it 6–4 before Pitre and Corbeau scored to make the final score 8–4.

Game two
Seattle tied the series with a convincing win played under NHA hockey rules. Morris opened the scoring at nine minutes of the first period. Wilson scored to make it 2–0 for Seattle after the first period. Morris and Foyston scored in the second to put Seattle up 4–0 after two periods. Frank Foyston then scored twice in the third period to complete his hat trick and give Seattle a lead of 6–0. Seattle then played defensively but Tommy Smith scored in the final minutes for the Canadiens to spoil the shutout. Frustration boiled over at the start of the third period with a fight between Roy Rickey and Billy Coutu before Harry Mummery jumped into the fray.

Game three
The game was played at a fast clip with no goals before Morris scored after ten minutes. Montreal's goaltender Georges Vézina made several big saves in the second to hold Seattle off from scoring. Coutu and Rickey had their third fight of the series and Coutu was given a twenty-minute penalty and Rickey a ten-minute period. The Canadiens held off Seattle in an ensuing power play to end the second with Seattle holding a one-goal lead. In the third, Foyston scored after five minutes and Morris scored a quick pair of goals to give Seattle a 4–0 lead.

Game four
In an individual rush, Morris put the Mets ahead early in the first period. The Canadiens tried to fight back, but were stymied by the defences of Seattle. Seattle scored three times in the second period to put the game out of reach. In the third, the onslaught continued, as the Mets led 7–0 before Laviolette scored to break the shut out.

Stanley Cup engraving
The 1917 Stanley Cup was presented by the trophy's trustee William Foran. The Metropolitans never did engrave their name on the Cup for their championship season.

It was not until the trophy was redesigned in 1948 that the words "1917 Seattle Metropolitans" was put onto its then-new collar.

The following Metropolitans players and staff were members of the Stanley Cup winning team.

1916–17 Seattle Metropolitans

Banner
The Seattle Kraken revealed and hung a banner in honor of their forerunners' achievement on October 27, 2021, the night they hosted the Canadiens for the first time; if one does not include a 1961 exhibition game against the Seattle Totems, the Canadiens had not played a game of professional hockey in Seattle in 102 years – since the 1919 Stanley Cup Finals that was never completed due to the Spanish flu pandemic.

See also
 1916–17 NHA season
 1916–17 PCHA season

References

 
 

Notes

Stanley Cup Finals
Stanley Cup
Stanley Cup
Stan
Stan
Ice hockey in Seattle
Montreal Canadiens games
Seattle Metropolitans games
Stanley Cup
Sports competitions in Seattle
1910s in Seattle
Stanley Cup